β-Neoendorphin is an endogenous opioid peptide with a nonapeptide structure and the amino acid sequence Tyr-Gly-Gly-Phe-Leu-Arg-Lys-Tyr-Pro (YGGFLRKYP).

β-Neoendorphins (β-NEP) have the capability to stimulate wound healing by accelerating keratinocyte migration. This is achieved by β-NEP's activation of mitogen-activated protein kinase (MAPK) and extracellular signal-regulated kinases 1 and 2 (ERK 1 and ERK 2); along with the upregulation of matrix metalloproteinase 2 and 9 (MMP-2 and MMP-9). Wound healing by β-NEP results in migration without consequences on proliferation in human keratinocytes.

See also
 Neoendorphin

References

Opioid peptides